Braås is a locality situated in Växjö Municipality, Kronoberg County, Sweden with 1,547 inhabitants in 2010.

References 

Populated places in Kronoberg County
Populated places in Växjö Municipality
Värend